Frida – The Mixes is a remix album by Swedish singer Anni-Frid Lyngstad, under the name of Frida, from her 1996 album Djupa andetag. This album was released exclusively in Germany in 1998. It was compiled by Stefan Bürger who was keen of the idea providing the mixes used, as bonus tracks to fans outside Sweden.

Track listing
All tracks written by Anders Glenmark. Track 1 and 6 remixed by Vinny Vero, Track 2 remixed by John Amatiello and Martin Pihl, Track 3-7 remixed by Anders Glenmark.

See also 
Djupa andetag

References

Anni-Frid Lyngstad albums
1998 compilation albums
1998 remix albums